Suzanne is a 2013 French drama film directed by Katell Quillévéré.  In January 2014 the film received five nominations at the 39th César Awards, with Adèle Haenel winning the award for Best Supporting Actress.

Plot
Following the death of her mother, Suzanne and her younger sister are raised by their father alone. At the age of 17, Suzanne becomes the mother of a son. Her father and her sister support the both of them. Suzanne then falls in love with a gangster named Julien, abandoning her family to follow Julien to Marseille eventually ending up in prison. Upon her release, she finds her son Charlie living in a foster family. Trying to put her life together, Suzanne nevertheless falls into old habits when Julien finds her on a bus and persuades her to leave for Morocco with him. Once again abandoning her family, Suzanne has a second child. Returning home she goes to visit her mother's grave and discovers that during her absence her sister Maria has died. Crossing the border back to Morocco, Suzanne, in a fit of grief confesses that she is travelling on a false passport. In prison Suzanne is visited by her father, teenage son and toddler daughter and watches as her son and daughter play together.

Cast
 Sara Forestier as Suzanne Merevsky
 François Damiens as Nicolas Merevsky
 Adèle Haenel as Maria Merevsky
 Paul Hamy as Julien
 Anne Le Ny as Madame Danvers
 Lola Dueñas as Irène
 Corinne Masiero as Éliane

Reception
Suzanne has a 91% approval rating on Rotten Tomatoes and a 75/100 on Metacritic.

References

External links

 
 Press kit (en)

2013 films
2013 drama films
2010s coming-of-age drama films
2010s French-language films
French coming-of-age drama films
Films directed by Katell Quillévéré
2010s French films
French pregnancy films
Teenage pregnancy in film